Alonzo Kimball (November 29, 1808August 7, 1900) was an American politician. He served as mayor of Green Bay, Wisconsin in 1871 and 1873. He is also the grandfather of American portrait painter and illustrator Alonzo Myron Kimball (18741923).

Early life and career
Alonzo Kimball was born in Jefferson County, New York, the fifth of twelve children to Ruel and Hannah Kimball. He attended Union College and Andover Theological Seminary. Kimball had intended to become a clergyman, but health problems kept him from doing so. He married the daughter of a clergyman when he married Sarah Weston (18111891), daughter of Rev. Isaiah Weston of Dalton, Massachusetts, in 1840. The couple had six children: William, Sarah, Mary, Alonzo, Charles and Mather. 

Alonzo Kimball and his family relocated to Milwaukee, Wisconsin in 1847 and then moved to Green Bay in 1849. After a few years of teaching in the public school in Green Bay, he decided to change careers, and he established a successful hardware store there. In Green Bay he also served as mayor in 1871 and 1873, as a city alderman, a member of the local school board, and as postmaster from 1877 to 1884. Green Bay named a street after him, Kimball Street.

Death
At the time of his death in 1900, at age 91, he was the oldest living graduate of Union College. He was survived by five of his six children.

References

1808 births
1900 deaths
People from Jefferson County, New York
Mayors of Green Bay, Wisconsin
Union College (New York) alumni
Andover Newton Theological School alumni
Schoolteachers from Wisconsin
19th-century American politicians
19th-century American educators